In enzymology, a phthalate 4,5-dioxygenase is an enzyme that catalyzes the chemical reaction

phthalate + NADH + H+ + O2  cis-4,5-dihydroxycyclohexa-1(6),2-diene-1,2-dicarboxylate + NAD+

The 4 substrates of this enzyme are phthalate, NADH, H+, and O2, whereas its two products are cis-4,5-dihydroxycyclohexa-1(6),2-diene-1,2-dicarboxylate and NAD+.

This enzyme belongs to the family of oxidoreductases, specifically those acting on paired donors, with O2 as oxidant and incorporation or reduction of oxygen. The oxygen incorporated need not be derived from O2 with NADH or NADPH as one donor, and incorporation of two atoms of oxygen into the other donor.  The systematic name of this enzyme class is phthalate,NADH:oxygen oxidoreductase (4,5-hydroxylating). Other names in common use include PDO, and phthalate dioxygenase.  This enzyme participates in 2,4-dichlorobenzoate degradation.  It has 3 cofactors: iron, FMN,  and Iron-sulfur.

References

 

EC 1.14.12
NADPH-dependent enzymes
NADH-dependent enzymes
Iron enzymes
Flavoproteins
Iron-sulfur enzymes
Enzymes of unknown structure